Polyptychus coryndoni is a moth of the family Sphingidae. It is known from Brachystegia woodland from Zimbabwe to Malawi, Zambia, the Democratic Republic of the Congo and Tanzania. It has also been recorded from northern Nigeria.

The length of the forewings is 34–38 mm for males and 39–43 mm for females. The forewings are grey with rather faint dark transverse lines. There is a blackish spot near the tornus and occasionally traces of basal spots. The hindwings are brick red, edged with black, except at the tornus which is grey. There are two black spots near the tornus and traces of the inner marginal black streak. The body is grey. The female has broader wings, which are also more rounded than in males. The forewings and body are more brownish, sometimes almost cinnamon.

References

Polyptychus
Moths described in 1903
Lepidoptera of the Democratic Republic of the Congo
Lepidoptera of West Africa
Moths of Sub-Saharan Africa
Lepidoptera of Angola
Insects of the Central African Republic
Lepidoptera of Malawi
Lepidoptera of Tanzania
Lepidoptera of Zambia
Lepidoptera of Zimbabwe